is a former Japanese football player. He played for Japan national team.

Club career
Sato was born in Osaka Prefecture on June 19, 1969. After graduating from Doshisha University, he joined Gamba Osaka in 1992. However he did not play in the match. In 1994, he moved to Urawa Reds and debuted in J1 League. However he lost opportunity to play in 1995. In July 1995, he moved to Japan Football League club Kyoto Purple Sanga. The club won the 2nd place and was promoted to J1 League. He retired end of 1996 season.

National team career
On May 22, 1994, Sato debuted for Japan national team against Australia.

Club statistics

National team statistics

References

External links

Japan National Football Team Database

1969 births
Living people
Doshisha University alumni
Association football people from Osaka Prefecture
Japanese footballers
Japan international footballers
J1 League players
Japan Football League (1992–1998) players
Gamba Osaka players
Urawa Red Diamonds players
Kyoto Sanga FC players
Association football forwards